Frantic City is the second studio album by Teenage Head. It was released in 1980. The album was certified Platinum in Canada in 1983.

Track listing

Personnel 
Teenage Head
Frankie Venom (Kerr) - vocals
Gordon Lewis - guitar
Steve Mahon - bass
Nick Stipanitz - drums, vocals, backing vocals

Additional musicians
Ricky Morrison - saxophone
Grant Slater - piano

Production
Stacy Heydon - producer
Greg Roberts - engineer
Dean Motter - design

Chart positions

Singles

References

External links 
"Frantic City: Teenage Head" at Allmusic. Retrieved 24 June 2011.

1980 albums
Teenage Head (band) albums